The 1983–84 season was Colchester United's 42nd season in their history and third consecutive season in fourth tier of English football, the Fourth Division. Alongside competing in the Fourth Division, the club also participated in the FA Cup, the League Cup and the Associate Members' Cup.

Another promotion push ended a long way short with an eighth-placed finish, 15 points shy of the promotion places. Colchester reached the third round of the League Cup, where they faced Manchester United at Layer Road only to suffer a 2–0 defeat. They also reached the third round of the FA Cup, exiting to Charlton Athletic. In the inaugural Associate Members' Cup, the U's fell to a 2–0 defeat to Essex rivals Southend United in the second round.

Season overview
Cyril Lea began his first full season in charge by bringing in assistant Stewart Houston in a player-coach capacity. He had however already seen the frustrating exit of last seasons top scorer Ian Allinson, who was allowed to leave the club for Arsenal on a free transfer following an administrative error.

In the early stages of the season, Colchester kept pace with the leaders as they embarked on a League Cup run. Following a 1–1 draw at Second Division Swansea City, chairman Maurice Cadman pledged Lea funds to purchase two players if there was an attendance greater than 5,000 in the second leg of the tie. As such, 5,204 were in attendance to see the U's beat the Swans 1–0. They were drawn at home to Manchester United in the third round as Layer Road saw its final-ever five figure gate when 13,031 saw the 2–0 defeat for the U's.

Colchester's form tailed off in the latter stages of the season as they ended the season 15 points adrift of the promotion places in eighth position, despite Tony Adcock's 33 goals. Now frustrated at his board's successive attempts to fund promotion that ultimately ended in failure, Maurice Cadman announced that win bonuses would be dropped for the 1984–85 season replaced by an insurance-backed promotion bonus. He also announced that the club had been put up for sale at a value of £150,000.

Attendances on average were up, largely in thanks to the cup runs, but otherwise league attendances dropped off, and a new low of 1,226 witnessed Colchester's 3–0 win over Torquay United on 28 April 1984. Meanwhile, stalwarts Micky Cook, who had set a club record of 614 league appearances, and Steve Leslie both retired through injury.

Players

Transfers

In

 Total spending:  ~ £15,000

Out

 Total incoming:  ~ £0

Loans out

Match details

Fourth Division

Results round by round

League table

Matches

League Cup

FA Cup

Associate Members' Cup

Squad statistics

Appearances and goals

|-
!colspan="16"|Players who appeared for Colchester who left during the season

|}

Goalscorers

Disciplinary record

Clean sheets
Number of games goalkeepers kept a clean sheet.

Player debuts
Players making their first-team Colchester United debut in a fully competitive match.

See also
List of Colchester United F.C. seasons

References

General
Books

Websites

Specific

1983-84
English football clubs 1983–84 season